Chaenorhinum origanifolium is a species of flowering plant in the family Plantaginaceae. It is native to mountainous regions of the Iberian Peninsula and the Balearic Islands. It grows on rocks and crevices of escarpments, usually in limestone cliffs.

Description
Chaenorhinum origanifolium is a perennial herb, which reaches a size of up to 40 cm in height, non-cespitose, glabrous or glandular-pubescent in the lower third, densely glandular-pubescent in the upper part, with whitish appearance. Stems relatively thick and rigid to thin and flexuous, erect, ascending or prostrate, simple or branched from the base, purple at the base. Leaves of 4–23 × 2–13 mm, petiole 1.5–4.5 mm-, from suborbicular to oblanceolate, from acute to obtuse, attenuate in bas. Inflorescence with 2–25 flowers, lax. Flowers with pedicel of 5–30 mm −10-32 mm in fruiting-, straight, erect or erect-patent, slightly accentuating. Calyx with linear-spatulate, subacute, subequal sepals, of a purplish green, with dense glandular-pubescent indwelling on the outer face. Capsule 2.5–5.5 mm, subglobose, shorter than the calyx, with subequal, smooth, glandular-pubescent locules. Seeds of 0.5–0.9 × 0.4–0.5 mm, crested, dark brown or black; longitudinal crests, sinuous, continuous, sometimes slightly anastomose, smooth, taller than broad.

References

Plantaginaceae
Flora of Spain
Plants described in 1753
Taxa named by Carl Linnaeus